Tiger Fangs is a 1943 American adventure/thriller film directed by Sam Newfield and starring Frank Buck and June Duprez. It was distributed Producers Releasing Corporation. The film's sets were designed by the art director Paul Palmentola.

Plot
Frank Buck tangles with Nazis who have been doping tigers in Malaya, thereby making man-eaters of them. With the cats on a rampage, rubber production is seriously curtailed and the Allied war effort jeopardized. Buck and his associates, Peter Jeremy, Geoffrey MacCardle and Linda McCardle, thwart the Teutonic malefactors: the villainous Nazi Dr. Lang (Arno Frey) and his portly accomplice Henry Gratz. Thereafter, life is safe once again in the jungle.

Cast
 Frank Buck as Frank Buck
 June Duprez as Linda McCardle
 Duncan Renaldo as Peter Jeremy
 Howard Banks as Tom Clayton
 J. Farrell MacDonald as Geoffrey MacCardle
 Alex Havier as Ali (credited as J. Alex Havier)
 Arno Frey as Dr. Lang
 Dan Seymour as Henry Gratz
 Pedro Regas as Takko

Reception
“Juves should find this Frank Buck actioner exciting. It's a fiction piece, and not the usual jungle travelogue…June Duprez is as attractive a biologist as one could hope to meet up with in the middle of the jungle.”

“The animal shots are eye-filling, as usual, and especially well photographed…They're
convincing enough…to keep the younger generation glued to movie house seats. Sam Newfield directed with a good sense of melodramatic action, and it is Mr. Buck himself who gives the stand-out performance. The jungle fellow is a right natural actor.”

Gallery

References

Bibliography

External links

Brian Taves, "Candidates for the National Film Registry: Fang and Claw and Tiger Fangs"

1943 adventure films
1943 films
American World War II propaganda films
American black-and-white films
Films directed by Sam Newfield
Producers Releasing Corporation films
American adventure films
1940s English-language films